Orville Clarence Redenbacher (July 16, 1907 – September 19, 1995) was an American food scientist and businessman most often associated with the brand of popcorn that bears his name which is now owned by ConAgra. The New York Times described him as "the agricultural visionary who all but single-handedly revolutionized the American popcorn industry".

Early life

Orville Clarence Redenbacher was born in Brazil, Indiana, on July 16, 1907, the son of Julia Magdalena Dierdorff (1874–1944) and farmer William Joseph Redenbacher (1872–1939). He grew up on his family's farm, where he sometimes sold popcorn from the back of his car. He graduated from Brazil High School in 1924 in the top 5% of his class. He attended Purdue University, where he joined the agriculture-oriented Alpha Gamma Rho fraternity, marched tuba in the Purdue All-American Marching Band, joined the Purdue University track team, and worked at the Purdue Exponent. He graduated in 1928 with a degree in agronomy.  He spent most of his life in the agriculture industry, serving as a Vigo County Farm Bureau extension agent in Terre Haute, Indiana, and at Princeton Farms in Princeton, Indiana.

Business career
The New York Times described Redenbacher: "But for all his bumpkin appearance, the man with the signature white wavy hair and oversized bow tie was a shrewd agricultural scientist who experimented with hybrids." He began his career selling fertilizer, but spent his spare time working with popcorn.

In 1951, Redenbacher and partner Charlie Bowman bought the George F. Chester and Son seed corn plant in Boone Grove, Indiana. Naming the company "Chester Hybrids", they tried tens of thousands of hybrid strains of popcorn before settling on a hybrid they named "RedBow".

An advertising agency advised them to use Orville Redenbacher's own name as the brand name. They launched their popping corn in 1970.

In 1976, Redenbacher sold the company to Hunt-Wesson Foods, a division of Norton Simon, Inc. In 1983, Esmark purchased Norton Simon, which in turn was acquired by Beatrice Foods in 1984. In 1985, Kohlberg Kravis Roberts acquired Beatrice with the goal of selling off businesses. In 1990, they sold the popcorn business and other old Hunt-Wesson businesses to agribusiness giant ConAgra.

Advertising
In 1973 Redenbacher appeared on TV's To Tell the Truth game show.

By the mid-1970s, Redenbacher and Bowman had captured a third of the unpopped-popcorn market. Redenbacher then moved to Coronado, California, where he lived for the remainder of his life.

He appeared as the company's official spokesman, wearing a trademark outfit in public that included horn-rimmed glasses and a bow tie. Sometimes Redenbacher appeared in commercials with his grandson, Gary Redenbacher. Some customers wrote letters asking if Redenbacher was a real person, and not an actor (see, e.g., Bartles & Jaymes). He responded to this by appearing on various talk shows, professing his identity. Redenbacher, in his book, states, "I want to make it clear that I am real."

Personal life
Redenbacher married Corinne Rosemund Strate in 1928, and they remained married until her death at the age of 62 in 1971. Later that year, he married Nina Reder, and they remained married until her death at the age of 91 in May 1991. The New York Times noted upon his death that he had two daughters named Billie Ann Atwood and Gail Tuminello, through whom he had 12 grandchildren and 10 great-grandchildren.

Death and legacy
On September 19, 1995, Redenbacher died in the Jacuzzi of his condominium in Coronado, California. He suffered a heart attack and drowned. He was cremated and his ashes scattered at sea.

On the September 23, 1995, edition of Siskel & Ebert, Roger Ebert eulogized Redenbacher by calling him "a man who took popcorn seriously, as seriously as we take the movies." His co-host, Gene Siskel, added that "he actually was more than just a cute, cuddly advertising figure. He actually was a scientist who came up with a new strain of popcorn that really kept that whole industry alive [...] that's a real contribution."

In 1988, Purdue University awarded him an honorary doctorate.

Aside from his popcorn contribution, the entertainment provided by the TV commercials in which he starred was noteworthy.

Since 2006, several of Orville's commercials from the 1970s and 1980s have aired on many channels across the United States. The advertisements for the brand's "natural" popcorn snacks were introduced in 2008, 13 years after Redenbacher's death, and feature a clip of him at the end.

In January 2007, a television commercial featuring a digital recreation of Redenbacher appeared. Redenbacher's grandson, Gary Redenbacher, responded to questions about how he felt about the advertisement by saying: "Grandpa would go for it. He was a cutting-edge guy. This was a way to honor his legacy." Redenbacher's business partner, Charles F. Bowman, died in 2009.

On September 4, 2012, Valparaiso, Indiana, unveiled a statue of Redenbacher at the city's annual popcorn festival.

In 2022, Redenbacher was mentioned by American musical comedian Bo Burnham in the song "Microwave Popcorn" from the deluxe edition of his soundtrack album Inside (The Songs).

Notes

1907 births
1995 deaths
Accidental deaths in California
American food industry businesspeople
American Methodists
Businesspeople from Indiana
Deaths by drowning in California
People from Brazil, Indiana
People from Princeton, Indiana
People from Coronado, California
People from Terre Haute, Indiana
People from Valparaiso, Indiana
Popcorn
Purdue University College of Agriculture alumni
20th-century American businesspeople